Cineraria canescens is a species of flowering plant in the family Asteraceae, native to southern Africa (Namibia and South Africa). It was first described in 1822.

References

canescens
Flora of Southern Africa
Plants described in 1822